The Green Line, also known as Line 1, is one of the four lines of the Montreal Metro in Montreal, Quebec, Canada. The line runs through the commercial section of downtown Montreal underneath Boulevard de Maisonneuve, formerly Rue de Montigny. It runs mainly on a northeast to southwest axis with a connection to the Orange and Yellow Lines at Berri-UQAM, and with the Orange Line west of downtown at Lionel-Groulx.

The section between Atwater and Frontenac was part of the initial network; the line was extended to Honoré-Beaugrand in 1976 to provide easy access to 1976 Summer Olympics sites. It was extended to Angrignon in 1978. All but three stations — De L'Église, Lionel-Groulx, and Charlevoix — are side platform stations.

History
The first stations, found on the section between Atwater and Papineau, opened on October 14, 1966. Several smaller sections were delayed by several months. On December 19, 1966, the line was further extended from Papineau to Frontenac, and two days later came the stopover Beaudry between Berri-UQAM and Papineau. On December 20, 1967, Frédéric Back completed his art piece  L'histoire de la musique à Montréal (The history of music in Montreal) in Place-des-Arts station. This commissioned piece was the first artwork completed in the Metro system.

The construction of the second phase began in 1971, when Montreal was awarded the bid to host the 1976 Summer Olympics. The goal was to have the ability to transport visitors from downtown to the Olympic Park in the east end. The opening of the section between Frontenac and Honoré-Beaugrand took place on June 6, 1976, six weeks before the start of the Summer Olympics. Green Line trains inaugurated an autopilot feature on November 8, 1976.

The third expansion phase, between Atwater and Angrignon, came into operation on September 3, 1978.

In the 2010s and 2020s, renovation work and the installation of elevators took place at many stations on the Green Line.

Rolling stock 
At the line's opening in 1966, MR-63 cars were used on the Green Line. Upon the introduction of the MR-73 cars on the Green Line in 1976, the older MR-63 cars were used on the Orange Line. From the early-1980s to 2018, MR-63 cars were again used on the Green Line.

With the introduction of the newer MPM-10 trains (also known as Azur) from 2016 on the Orange Line, the Green Line is now primarily served by both the MR-73 and MPM-10 cars. The MR-63 trains were fully retired on June 21, 2018. As of December 2021, all 71 Azur train sets had been delivered. Of these, 26 Azur train sets run on the Green Line..

List of stations

See also

 Orange Line
 Yellow Line
 Blue Line
 Red Line (Line 3)
 List of Montreal Metro stations

References

External links 
 2008 STM System Map

 
1966 establishments in Quebec
Rapid transit lines in Canada